An expatriate is a person temporarily or permanently residing in a country and culture other than that of the person's upbringing.

Expatriate may also refer to:

 Expatriate (album), a 2008 album by The Coast
 Expatriate (band), an Australian indie rock band
 Expatriates, novel by James Wesley Rawles, from the Patriots series
 The Expatriate, also known as Erased, a 2012 Canadian-Belgian thriller film
 Expatriate (film), a thriller film is directed by Barry Jenkins